Fail was a Portuguese parish in the municipality of Viseu, with 6.92 km2 (2.7 sq mi) and 664 inhabitants (2011). Density: 96 inhabitants / km2 (245/sq mi).

Freguesias of Viseu